Jefferson is a town in Grant County, Oklahoma, United States. The population was 12 at the 2010 census, a 67.6 percent decline from the figure of 37 in 2000.

Under its former name of Pond Creek, Jefferson was one of the participating towns in the Enid-Pond Creek Railroad War.

Geography
Jefferson is located at  (36.719127, -97.790498).

Climate

Demographics

As of the census of 2000, there were 37 people, 16 households, and 11 families residing in the town. There were 25 housing units at an average density of 92.0 per square mile (35.8/km2). The racial makeup of the town was 89.19% White, 2.70% Native American, 8.11% from other races. Hispanic or Latino of any race were 8.11% of the population.

There were 16 households, out of which 31.3% had children under the age of 18 living with them, 56.3% were married couples living together, 12.5% had a female householder with no husband present, and 31.3% were non-families. 31.3% of all households were made up of individuals, and 6.3% had someone living alone who was 65 years of age or older. The average household size was 2.31 and the average family size was 2.91.

In the town, the population was spread out, with 18.9% under the age of 18, 10.8% from 18 to 24, 24.3% from 25 to 44, 29.7% from 45 to 64, and 16.2% who were 65 years of age or older. The median age was 42 years. For every 100 females, there were 131.3 males. For every 100 females age 18 and over, there were 150.0 males.

The median income for a household in the town was $30,000, and the median income for a family was $43,000. Males had a median income of $30,417 versus $28,750 for females. The per capita income for the town was $16,292. There were 20.0% of families and 18.9% of the population living below the poverty line, including no under eighteens and 66.7% of those over 64.

See also
 Chisholm Trail
 Pond Creek, Oklahoma

References

External links
 Jefferson at GhostTowns.com
 Encyclopedia of Oklahoma History and Culture - Jefferson
 Hell on Rails : Oklahoma Towns at War with the Rock Island Railroad, historynet.com

Towns in Grant County, Oklahoma
Towns in Oklahoma